Robert Tăciulet (born 8 February 1972) is a Romanian gymnast. He competed at the 1996 Summer Olympics.

References

External links
 

1972 births
Living people
Romanian male artistic gymnasts
Olympic gymnasts of Romania
Gymnasts at the 1996 Summer Olympics
People from Buzău